Jarmila Machačová (born 9 January 1986) is a Czech professional racing cyclist.

Major results

Road
Source:

2006
 3rd Time trial, National Road Championships
 3rd Zingem
 3rd Belsele-Puivelde
 3rd De Klinge
2007
 2nd Road race, National Road Championships
 3rd Wiener Radfest
2008
 National Road Championships
1st  Time trial
2nd Road race
 2nd ELK Heurigen Grand Prix
2009
 National Road Championships
3rd Time trial
3rd Road race
 7th Overall Tour de Feminin-O cenu Českého Švýcarska
2011
 National Road Championships
3rd Time trial
3rd Road race
2012
 1st  Time trial, National Road Championships
2015
 2nd Time trial, National Road Championships
2016
 2nd Time trial, National Road Championships
2017
 National Road Championships
2nd Time trial
3rd Road race
 6th VR Women
 9th Overall Gracia–Orlová
1st  Mountains classification
1st  Active rider classification
2018
 National Road Championships
1st  Road race
2nd Time trial
 8th VR Women ITT
2019
 National Road Championships
2nd Time trial
3rd Road race
 2nd Pannonhalma, V4 Ladies Series
2020
 1st  Road race, National Road Championships
2021
 2nd Time trial, National Road Championships

Track

2006
 2nd  Scratch, 2005–06 UCI Track Cycling World Cup Classics, Sydney
 3rd  Points race, UEC European Under-23 Track Championships
2007
 3rd  Scratch, UEC European Under-23 Track Championships
 3rd  Points race, 2007–08 UCI Track Cycling World Cup Classics, Sydney
2008
 2007–08 UCI Track Cycling World Cup Classics
1st  Points race, Los Angeles
2nd  Scratch, Copenhagen
2009
 1st  Points race, 2008–09 UCI Track Cycling World Cup Classics, Beijing
 International Track Challenge Vienna
3rd Individual pursuit
3rd Points race
3rd Scratch
2010
 1st Points race, Melbourne
 3rd Omnium, Grand Prix Vienna
2011
 2nd  Points race, UCI Track Cycling World Championships
 3rd  Points race, UEC European Track Championships
2012
 2nd  Scratch, 2011–12 UCI Track Cycling World Cup, London
 2012–13 UCI Track Cycling World Cup, Cali
2nd  Scratch
3rd  Omnium
2013
 1st  Points race, UCI Track Cycling World Championships
 UCI Track Cycling World Ranking
1st Overall Points race
1st Overall Scratch
 2nd  Points race, 2012–13 UCI Track Cycling World Cup, Aguascalientes
 3rd  Points race, 2013–14 UCI Track Cycling World Cup, Aguascalientes
2014
 2nd Points race, Grand Prix Minsk
2015
 GP Czech Cycling Federation
1st Points race
1st Scratch
2nd 500m time trial
 Trofeu Ciutat de Barcelona
1st Points race
1st Scratch
2016
 1st Scratch, Six Days of Bremen
 Prostejov GP - Memorial of Otmar Malecek
1st Scratch
3rd Points race
 GP Czech Cycling Federation
1st Team pursuit (with Lucie Hochmann, Eva Planickova and Ema Kankovska)
3rd Points race
 2nd Points race, Grand Prix Vienna
 3rd  Points race, 2016–17 UCI Track Cycling World Cup, Apeldoorn
2017
 1st Scratch, Six Days of Bremen
 1st Madison, Finale 4 Bahnen Tournee (with Lucie Hochmann)
 2nd Points race, Track Cycling Challenge
 3rd  Points race, 2017–18 UCI Track Cycling World Cup, Milton
 3rd Madison, 2. Etappe 4 Bahnen tournee (with Lucie Hochmann)
2019
 3rd  Points race, European Games
2020
 National Track Championships
1st  Points race
1st  Team pursuit
2nd Individual pursuit
3rd Scratch
2021
 National Track Championships (February)
1st  Omnium
2nd Elimination race
2nd Madison (with Dagmar Hejhalová)
 National Track Championships (December)
1st  Team pursuit
2nd Elimination race
2nd Omnium

References

External links
 
 
 
 
 

1986 births
Living people
Czech female cyclists
Sportspeople from Havlíčkův Brod
UCI Track Cycling World Champions (women)
Czech track cyclists
Cyclists at the 2019 European Games
European Games medalists in cycling
European Games bronze medalists for the Czech Republic